

Culture
 Martin Abellana – Visayan author (Cebu City)
 Cecilia Manguerra Brainard – author, editor (Cebu City)
 Simeon Dumdum Jr. - writer, poet and former RTC judge (Balamban)
 Vicente Sotto – politician, author (Cebu City)

Media
 Amelyn Veloso - broadcast journalist CNN Philippines (Cebu City)

Entertainment
 Amapola – singer, musician, actress, TV host, novelist (Sibonga)
 Akiko Solon - singer, actress (Lapu-Lapu City)
 Albert Martinez - actor (Cebu City)
 Jason Dy - singer (Cebu City)
 Anna Fegi – singer (Toledo)
 Annabelle Rama - actress, talent manager 
 Bailey May - actor, model (Cebu City)
 Ben Zubiri – singer, stage actor and World War 2 Guerrilla (Cebu City)
 BISAYA NI BAI - internet celebrity (Mandaue)
 Sheryn Regis - singer (Carcar)
 Buboy Villar - actor , comedian (Cebu City)
 Cattski - singer-songwriter, musician, record producer (Cebu City)
 Caridad Sanchez – actress (Mandaue)
 Christopher De Leon - actor (Cebu City)
 Chanda Romero - actress (her mother is from Cebu City)
 Claudia Zobel - actress (Mandaue)
 Cueshe - band (Cebu City)
 Dave Bornea - actor (Talisay)
 Devon Seron – actress (Cebu City)
 Dionne Monsanto - actress (Cebu City)
 Diva Montelaba - actress, dancer (Cebu City)
 Dominic Roco - actor (Lapu-Lapu City)
 Dulce - singer (Cebu City)
 Eda Nolan – actress (Cebu City)
 Ellen Adarna – Actress, Model, Socialite (Cebu City)
 Enrique Gil – actor, former dancer (Cebu City)
 Erich Gonzales - actress (Cebu City)
 Eula Caballero – actress (Boljoon)
 Felix Roco - actor (Lapu-Lapu City)
 Fretzie Bercede - actress (Cebu City)
 Gloria Sevilla – actress (Sibonga)
 Golden Cañedo - singer (Minglanilla)
 Isabel Oli – actress (born in Quezon City, grew up in Cebu City)
 Isabel Sandoval - director (grew up in Cebu City)
 Jackie Lou Blanco - actress (Cebu City)
 Janella Salvador - actress (Cebu City)
 Janine Berdin - singer, actress (Lapu-Lapu City)
 Jay-R Siaboc - singer (Toledo)
 Joan Almedilla - singer, actress (Cebu City)
 Juan Karlos Labajo - actor, singer (Consolacion)
 Keanna Reeves – actress, comedian (Danao)
 Kenneth Earl Medrano - actor, model (Cebu City)
 Kim Chiu – actress, singer (Cebu City)
 Kiray Celis - comedian actress (Cebu City)
 Kyle Echarri - actor, endorsement, singer (grew up in Cebu City)
 Lilian Velez - actress (Cebu City)
 Manilyn Reynes – singer, actress (Cebu City)
 Manuel Kabajar Cabase aka Mahnee or Manny – composer, arranger, multi-instrumentalist (Cebu City)
 Mark Joseph - actor (Bantayan)
 Matteo Guidicelli – actor, singer, car racer (Cebu City)
 Maureen Larrazabal - actress (Cebu City)
 Max Surban - singer (Cebu City)
 Medyo Maldito - internet celebrity, songwriter (Cebu City)
 Mike "Pekto" Nacua - comedian (Cebu City)
 Monica Cuenco - actress (Cebu City)
 Morissette - singer, songwriter, and actress (Minglanilla)
 Marco Alcaraz -  Filipino actor, commercial model, and former varsity basketball player at San Sebastian College-Recoletos (Cebu City)
 Nicole Uysiuseng – actress (Cebu City)
 Niel Murillo – singer (Bogo)
 Panky Trinidad – singer (Cebu City)
 Paul Jake Castillo - actor, businessman (Cebu City)
 Pilita Corrales - actress, singer (Cebu City)
 Richard Yap – actor, singer, businessman (Cebu City)
 Redford White - comedian (Bogo)
 Slater Young – actor, businessman (born in Manila, based in Cebu City)
 Suzette Ranillo - actress (Cebu City)
 Terence Baylon - actor (Cebu City)
 Tita Duran - actress (Pinamungajan)
 Urbandub - band (Cebu)
 Van Roxas - actor (Talisay)
 Vina Morales – singer, dancer, actress (Bogo)
 Vivian Velez - actress (Cebu City)
 Zandra Summer - actress (Cebu City)

Politics and government
 Thomas F. Breslin – surveyor of large sections of Cebu, Colonel, Bataan Death March victim
 Mariano Jesús Cuenco – Senate President during the First Congress of the Philippines (Carmen)
 Hilario Davide Jr. -  Chief Justice of the Supreme Court under Estrada Administration (Argao)
 Hilario Davide III - Governor of Cebu (2013-2019), Vice-Governor of Cebu (2019–present) (Cebu City)
 Joseph Ace Durano - DOT Secretary under Arroyo Administration (Danao)
 Marcelo Fernan – Chief Justice of the Supreme Court and Senate President (Cebu City)
 Gwendolyn Garcia - Governor of Cebu (2004-2013; 2019–present), 3rd District Representative (2013-2019) (Cebu City)
 Pablo Garcia - Former 3rd (1987-1995) & 2nd (2007-2013) District Representative, Former Governor (1995-2004) (Barili)
 Pablo John Garcia - 3rd District Representative (2007-2013; 2019–present) (Cebu City)
 Winston Garcia - President and General Manager of GSIS under Arroyo Administration (Cebu City)
 Ernesto Herrera - Ex-Senator of the Philippines (Samboan)
 John Henry Osmeña - Former Senator and Former 3rd District Representative (1995-1998) (Cebu City)
 Sergio Osmeña Sr. – Second President of the Commonwealth of the Philippines (Cebu City)
 Sergio Osmeña Jr. - Former Senator and Former Governor (Cebu City)
 Sergio Osmeña III - Former Senator 
 Tomas Osmeña - Former Mayor of Cebu City (1987-1995; 2001-2010; 2016–2019)
 Cerge Remonde - Press Secretary under Arroyo Administration (Argao)
 Michael Rama – Former Mayor of Cebu (2010–2016), Vice-Mayor of Cebu City (2001-2010; 2019–present) (Cebu City)
 Vicente Rama - Former Senator of the Philippines
 Jose Rene Almendras - Former Energy Secretary and Former Foreign Affairs Secretary of PNOY Administration (Cebu City)

Sports
 Gabriel "Flash" Elorde – boxer and former world champion (Bogo)
 Dondon Ampalayo – basketball player (Cebu City)
 Dondon Hontiveros – basketball player (Cebu City)
 Ray Anthony Jónsson – Icelandic–Filipino footballer (Liloan)
 Manny Paner  – basketball player (Cebu City)
 J. R. Quiñahan – basketball player (Cebu City)
 June Mar Fajardo – basketball player (Pinamungahan)
 Eliud Poligrates – basketball player (Poro)
 Elmer Cabahug – basketball player (Cebu City)
 Roger Pogoy – basketball player (Minglanilla)
 Mercito Gesta - boxer (Mandaue)
 Warren Kiamco - billiard player (Cebu City)
 Rubilen Amit - billiard player (Mandaue)
 Manny Paner - basketball player (Cebu City)
 Frank Cedeno - boxer (Talisay)
 Eric Chavez - boxer (Cebu City)
 Rodel Mayol - boxer (Mandaue)
 Malcolm Tunacao - boxer (Mandaue)
 Bernabe Villacampo - boxer (Toledo)
 Mary Joy Tabal - triathlon (Cebu City)
 Bert Batawang - boxer (Cebu City)
 Arlo Chavez - boxer (Bantayan)
 Roger Yap - basketball player (Cebu City)
 Robert Labagala - basketball player (Talisay)
 Aldrech Ramos - basketball player (Cebu City)
 Reed Juntilla - basketball player (Carmen)
 Junthy Valenzuela - basketball player (Bogo)
 Jimwell Torion - basketball player (Cebu City)
 Margielyn Didal - street skateboarder (Cebu City)
 Rolando Pascua - boxer (Cebu City)

Fashion, designs and arts
 Monique Lhuillier – fashion designer (Cebu City)
 Kenneth Cobonpue – International Furniture Designer (Cebu City)

Business
 Lucio Tan - Filipino-Chinese Businessman (LT Group Inc.)
 Vicki Belo - Filipino businesswoman (Belo Medical Group)

Beauty title holder
 Beatrice Luigi Gomez - Miss Universe Philippines 2021 and Miss Universe Top 5 finalist
Maria Karla Bautista - Miss World Philippines 2004 & Miss World and Oceania 2004
 Rizzini Alexis Gomez - Miss Tourism International 2012 
 Karla Paula Henry - Miss Earth 2008
 Rogelie Catacutan - Miss Supranational Philippines 2015
 Gazini Ganados - Miss Universe Philippines 2019 and Miss Universe 2019 Top 20 semi finalist
 Pilar Pilapil - Miss Universe 1967

Religious
 Pedro Calungsod - 2nd Saint in the Philippines
 Teofilo Camomot - A beatified bishop in the Philippines

Heroes
 Lapu-Lapu - First Hero in the Philippines
 Leon Kilat - Hero in the Philippine Revolution

Education
 Vicente Gullas - Founder of University of the Visayas

Notable people with roots from Cebu
 Rodrigo Duterte - His father was from Danao (16th President of the Philippines)
 Manny Pacquiao - His father was from Pinamungahan (Senator and Eight Division World Boxing Champion)
 Francis Magalona - His mother was from Cebu City (actor, the filipino king of rap)

People from Cebu
Cebu